Gregory Scott (born October 2, 1979) is a former American football defensive end who played in the National Football League, NFL Europe, and the Arena Football League.

He played college football at Hampton University and was drafted in the seventh round of the 2002 NFL Draft. He played for the Washington Redskins (2002) and the Cincinnati Bengals (2003–2004). In 2005, he was allocated to the Rhein Fire of NFLE. He played two seasons for the AFL's Grand Rapids Rampage (2006–2007).

References

External links
Profile from arenafootball.com

www.cover3foundation.org

1979 births
Living people
People from Franklin, Virginia
Players of American football from Virginia
American football defensive ends
Hampton Pirates football players
Washington Redskins players
Cincinnati Bengals players
Rhein Fire players
Grand Rapids Rampage players